This is the singles discography of American singer-songwriter Janet Jackson. Janet has sold more than 100 million records worldwide.  Billboard ranked her as well as the third greatest female artist of all time on Billboard Hot 100 history (behind Madonna and Mariah Carey).

She has attained 10 Hot 100 number-one singles, 16 Hot R&B number-one singles, and 20 Hot Dance/Club Play number-one singles. She also has a career high of 28 top 10 hits on the Hot 100, 31 top 10 hits on the Hot R&B chart, and 34 top 10 hits on the Hot Dance/Club Play chart. She is the first and only artist in history to produce seven top five hits from one album, Janet Jackson's Rhythm Nation 1814, and holds the record for the most consecutive top-ten entries on the US Billboard Hot 100 singles chart by a female artist with 18.

On January 9, 2010, Jackson's single "Make Me" reached number one on the US dance charts, upping her total to 19 number-one singles on the dance charts (the second-best sum in the chart's history at the time), and making her the first artist to achieve a number one single in each of the past four decades. In 2018, "Made for Now" marked her 20th number one and 40th entry on this chart and the only other collaboration to reach number one besides "Scream" with Michael Jackson, this one with Daddy Yankee (and his first number one on this chart).

Janet's Control, Rhythm Nation 1814 and The Velvet Rope albums are included in Rolling Stones "500 Greatest Albums of All Time" list. She has won five Grammy Awards and placed nine consecutive albums at top ten on the US Billboard 200.

1980s

1990s

2000s

2010s

As featured artist

Other single appearances

Promotional singles

See also
 Janet Jackson albums discography
 Janet Jackson videography
 List of awards and nominations received by Janet Jackson
 List of best selling music artists
 List of best-selling albums by women
 List of number-one hits (United States)
 List of artists who reached number one on the Hot 100 (U.S.)
 List of number-one dance hits (United States)
 List of artists who reached number one on the U.S. Dance chart

Notes

References

External links
 
 
 
 

Discography
Discographies of American artists
Pop music discographies
Rhythm and blues discographies